Chimonobambusa tumidissinoda (筇竹, commonly called walking stick bamboo) is a bamboo species, endemic to southwest Sichuan and northeast Yunnan, China, that has been used for walking sticks since the Han Dynasty. Its culms are 2.5–6 meters in height and 1–3 cm in diameter, with large and greatly swollen disk-like nodes.  Although it has been utilized since the Han Dynasty (some 1200 years ago) it somehow escaped scientific description until 1980.

Synonyms 
 Chimonobambusa tumidinoda T.H.Wen
 Qiongzhuea tumidinoda Hsueh & T.P.Yi
 Qiongzhuea tumidissinoda (Ohrnb.) Hsueh f. & T.P.Yi

References 

 Bamboos World Gen. Chimonobambusa 45 1990.
 Hortipedia
 BambooGarden

tumidissinoda